Mongolia participated in the 2014 Asian Para Games in Incheon, South Korea from 18 October to 24 October 2014.

Medal summary

Medals by sport

Medalists

Judo

Shooting

References

External links

Nations at the 2014 Asian Para Games
Asian Para Games
Mongolia at the Asian Para Games